Diplomatic Passport is a 1954 British thriller film directed by Gene Martel and starring Marsha Hunt, Paul Carpenter, Henry Oscar and Honor Blackman.  The film stars Hollywood actress Marsha Hunt , who was blacklisted during the McCarthyite era of the early 1950s. Like others in the same position, Hunt was obliged to seek work in the United Kingdom. Produced as a second feature it was made at MGM's Elstree Studios near London.

Synopsis
An American diplomat and his wife arrive in London, and are soon involved in a series of confusing and sometimes frightening events.

Cast
 Marsha Hunt as Judy Anderson
 Paul Carpenter as Ray Anderson
 Henry Oscar as The Chief
 Honor Blackman as Marcelle
 Marne Maitland as Philip
 John Bennett as André 
 John McLaren as Jack Gordon
 Henry B. Longhurst as 	Waiter 
 John Welsh as  Embassy Official
 George Murcell as 	Cafe Owner 
 Cyril Smith as Taxi Driver
 David Conville as Airline Clerk
 William Dexter as 	Airline Clerk
 John Boxer as Policeman

References

Bibliography
 Chibnall, Steve & McFarlane, Brian. The British 'B' Film. Palgrave MacMillan, 2009.

External links
 

1954 films
1950s thriller films
Films set in London
Films scored by Eric Spear
Films shot at MGM-British Studios
1950s English-language films
British thriller films
British black-and-white films
1950s British films